Ms Lyudmila Radkova-Traykova is a Bulgarian folk singer, performing folklore from the Balkans, who became world known as a soloist at the Filip Kutev Ensemble, and at the orchestra of Goran Bregovic. She is sister of the Bulgarian folk singer Daniela Radkova.

Biography
Lyudmila Radkova was born in a family with strong musical traditions. Her mother – Liliana Zhivkova – is a librarian, and performer in amateur arts. Her father – Radko Yankov is known for his voice and dancing skills.

Ludmila Radkova graduated the musical school in Kotel, Bulgaria, in 1987, and after exams is accepted to sing at the Filip Kutev Ensemble. Soon her soprano voice, filled with overtones, distinguishes her among the other singers, and she becomes soloist performer of all great songs of the ensemble. Her talent has a feel of lyricism, softness, femininity, and force, typical for the Bulgarian female singers. Her voice is unique, as Goran Bregovic says, and make his songs reflect this uniqueness, which brings them closer to people worldwide.

In 1995 she meets with Goran for the recording of the music in the movie Underground and since then she is always among the performers in his orchestra.

She has published a tape in Bulgaria in 1992, has solo parties in the Filip Kutev Ensemble's and Goran Bregovic's albums. She has participated in the Norwegian movie, Music for Weddings and Funerals. In 2010 she was awarded with the Bulgarian Medal of Honor. Both Ludmila and her sister, Daniela Radkova, are considered by the Bulgarian mainstream and online media as representatives of the country on the world concert stages. Factor.bg includes them in a list of Bulgarian female artists, who "protect the spirit of the nation". Ludmila Radkova is a regular guest at Bulgarian TV, radio and newspaper interviews.

Ludmila Radkova is married and has one child.

References

Additional Information
Facebook page: https://www.facebook.com/RadkoviSisters/

1968 births
21st-century Bulgarian women singers
People from Levski, Pleven Province
Living people
Bulgarian folk singers
20th-century Bulgarian women singers